Russell Dean Pees (born September 4, 1949) is a former American football coach who spent 18 seasons in the National Football League (NFL). He has served as the defensive coordinator  for the New England Patriots, Baltimore Ravens, Tennessee Titans, and Atlanta Falcons. Pees was also the head coach at Kent State University from 1998 to 2003, compiling a record of 17–51.

Coaching career

College football
Pees began his coaching career at Elmwood High School (Bloomdale, Ohio), after being the defensive coordinator for 2 years he got the head coaching position. A few years later he was hired to start his college coaching career in 1979 at the University of Findlay as their defensive coordinator and secondary coach following six years as a high school coach. In 1983, Pees moved to Miami University, where he was also the defensive coordinator and secondary coach of the team. From 1987 to 1989, Pees served as the secondary coach at the United States Naval Academy. Pees then took the defensive coordinator job, under Nick Saban, at the University of Toledo, which he held for four seasons with the team. He spent the 1994 season under head coach Lou Holtz as the secondary coach for the University of Notre Dame. From 1995 to 1997, Pees worked as the defensive coordinator and inside linebackers coach again under Saban at Michigan State University. In 1998, he earned his first head coaching job at Kent State University. Pees left the program after the 2003 season with a six-year record of 17–51.

NFL

New England Patriots

Prior to the 2004 NFL season, Pees left Kent State for the Patriots, spending two years as the Patriots' linebackers coach under head coach Bill Belichick, another Saban associate. Pees had coached alongside Bill's father, Steve Belichick, at Navy in the late 1980s. After the 2005 season, Pees was promoted to defensive coordinator, replacing Eric Mangini, who became the head coach of the New York Jets. With his contract set to expire following the 2009 season, Pees chose not to return to the Patriots on January 14, 2010.

Baltimore Ravens
On January 26, 2010, Pees was hired as the linebackers coach for the Baltimore Ravens. On January 27, 2012, Pees was promoted to defensive coordinator by head coach John Harbaugh. Pees was on the coaching staff that won Super Bowl XLVII. Pees announced his retirement on January 1, 2018.

Tennessee Titans

On January 29, 2018, Pees was hired as the defensive coordinator for the Tennessee Titans under head coach Mike Vrabel. On January 20, 2020, Pees announced his retirement from football for the second time.

Atlanta Falcons
On January 21, 2021, Pees was hired by the Atlanta Falcons as their defensive coordinator under head coach Arthur Smith. On January 9, 2023, Pees announced his retirement from football for the third time.

Head coaching record

References

External links
 Kent State Golden Flashes bio

1949 births
Living people
Baltimore Ravens coaches
Findlay Oilers football coaches
Kent State Golden Flashes football coaches
Miami RedHawks football coaches
Michigan State Spartans football coaches
National Football League defensive coordinators
Navy Midshipmen football coaches
New England Patriots coaches
Notre Dame Fighting Irish football coaches
Tennessee Titans coaches
Toledo Rockets football coaches
Bowling Green State University alumni
People from Hardin County, Ohio
Sportspeople from Ohio
Atlanta Falcons coaches